The Commandant of the Royal Observer Corps (CROC) was the Royal Air Force commander of the Royal Observer Corps.  All the holders of the post were RAF officers in the rank of Air Commodore, initially retired reserve officers then Auxiliary officers and, since the end of World War II, serving officers. The ROC was a uniformed civilian branch initially under the control of the Air Defence of Great Britain organization, then Fighter Command and latterly Strike Command.  The Royal Observer Corps existed from 1925 until it was stood down in 1995. Most of the commandants, with only three exceptions, were qualified RAF pilots, two being air navigators and the other a General Duties (Ground) Supply Branch officer. If a Royal Observer Corps officer had ever held the appointment, they would have held the rank of Observer Commodore.

The origins of the ROC go back to Metropolitan Observation Service of World War I which was founded by Air Vice Marshal Edward Ashmore. However, Ashmore never held the post of ROC Commandant. The first two commandants were recently retired RAF Air Commodores, the next two were Auxiliary Air Force officers and the remainder were serving RAF officers. The last three commandants held the appointment in addition to their primary appointment as Senior Air Staff Officer (SASO) at Headquarters No. 11/18 Group RAF, which was colocated with HQROC at RAF Bentley Priory.

The organisation had started as the volunteer civilian Observer Corps in 1925 and became the uniformed Royal Observer Corps in 1941 as part of the RAF in recognition of their invaluable services during the Battle of Britain. Despite several attempts by the Home Office in the 1950s, 1960s and the 1980s to take over the organisation and dispense with the RAF uniform the ROC remained part of RAF Fighter Command and later RAF Strike Command until they were stood down in 1995 as a result of the Communist Bloc breaking up and the Cold War nuclear threat on the UK being removed.

Commandants in chronological order

Commandant's insignia

See also
Royal Observer Corps
United Kingdom Warning and Monitoring Organisation

References

External links

Royal Air Force appointments
Royal Observer Corps
People of the Royal Observer Corps